Mental Health Practice is a monthly nursing journal covering the practice of mental health nursing published by RCNi.

External links

Publications established in 1998
Psychiatric and mental health nursing journals
Royal College of Nursing publications
English-language journals
10 times per year journals